Lucas Bond (born 14 December 2005) is a British actor. He is best known for his roles in Slumber (2017) and Summerland (2020).

Education
Bond is a pupil at Beechen Cliff School, a state day and boarding school for boys in Bath, in South West England.

Career
Lucas Bond made his acting debut in 2015, appearing in the horror movie Lady of Csejte. He plays Gerry in the 2015 British fantasy film Molly Moon and the Incredible Book of Hypnotism. In 2016 he appeared in two episodes of the American television drama series Of Kings and Prophets. In 2017, he played Daniel Morgan in the American-British supernatural horror-thriller film Slumber, he also appeared in an episode of The Miniaturist. In 2020 he played Frank, an evacuee from the London Blitz during World War II, in the British drama film Summerland.

Filmography

Films

Television

References

External links

Living people
21st-century English actors
21st-century English male actors
English film actors
People educated at Beechen Cliff School
2005 births